Salehy is a small village situated at the mouth of the Mangoro River on its north side at a distance of 10 km from Mahanoro, on the East coast of Madagascar.  The village of Ambodiharina lies across the Mangoro River from Salehy.

Industry
People there are living principally on fishing, agriculture, handicraft, “betsa” manufacturing (an alcoholic traditional beverage) and a small part of tourism.
People in Salehy, same as people from many villages in Madagascar, nowadays, are living in extreme poverty.

Geography
The village is surrounded by water, by the Canal des Pangalanes to the west, Mangoro River to the south, and Indian Ocean to the east, preceded by a small natural swimming pool called “Dobo masina”, meaning “Salted pool”.   The water is salty because of the ocean, as it can reach that body of water during the night even a kilometer inland.

To the east is the confluence of  the Mangoro River, the Canal, and the Indian Ocean.   This confluence changes its place but Salehy remains.  To the north, there is also a small lake named “Salehy be” (Big Salehy).  Before going there, ask riparian people what you shouldn’t do there.  The lake is still abounded of taboo.  It has abundant fish but no one take it from there.

Salehy has a very calm beach but be careful about the waves. Surfers can take profit there.

History
Historically, though an oral tradition, the name Salehy came from French people who passed by there.  They drank water from “Dobo masina”, and finding it salted, exclaimed “Ohh! C’est salé” (it’s salted).  The name of the place was after that Salehy.

Salehy is always a victim of every passing cyclone.  People there don’t build strong house because they say that it will be destroyed again by the cyclone next year.  The truth is that they don’t have enough resources to build strong house.

Salehy airports
The nearest airport is MNJ - Mananjary, located 140.2 km south of Salehy. 
Other airports nearby include TNR - Antananarivo Ivato (191.1 km north west), 
TMM - Toamasina (218.9 km north), 
WFI - Fianarantsoa (236.2 km south west).

Nearby towns
All distances 'as the bird flies' and approximate:
Tsangambato (1.9 km north) 
Ambodiharina (2.5 km south west) 
Ifasina (3.9 km north west) 
Ankazomirafy (5.8 km north) 
Betsizaraina (6.6 km north west) 
Ambohitsara (7.6 km north west) 
Niarovanivolo (8.2 km north west) 
Benavony (8.9 km south west)

References

Populated places in Atsinanana